The CNR Yenişehir Exhibition Center, formerly Mersin Yenişehir Exhibition Center, is an exhibition area in Mersin, Turkey.

Geography
At   the exhibition area is situated at the extreme west of Yenişehir second level municipality. It is to the north of Gazi Mustafa Kemal Boulevard.

History
The fairground was constructed by Yenişehir Municipality, and opened on October 18, 2007. It was operated by Forza Exhibition Co. until 51% of the company's stock was purchased by CNR Expo Co. on March 1, 2012, which is the current operator.
Although CNR runs an exhibition center in İstanbul Mersin is the first exhibition center of CNR in Anatolia. In the press conference held after the handover, Ceyda Erem the chairperson of the executive board said that the exhibition center will not only attract companies from the Mideast and Mediterranean but they also plan to bring European companies to Mersin.

Details
The total area of the fairground is  while  are covered. It consists of three exhibition halls,  foyer, five conference rooms,  art gallery, two cafés, a restaurant for 200 guests and  parking lot.

Major events
The Hall A of the exhibition center hosted fencing on June 22–23 and table tennis events on June 25–29 during the 2013 Mediterranean Games. Wrestling competitions of the Games were held in the Hall C between June 22 and 27.

References

Buildings and structures in Mersin
2013 Mediterranean Games venues
Fairgrounds in Turkey
Yenişehir, Mersin
Indoor arenas in Turkey
Sports venues in Mersin